WHLJ-FM (97.5 FM) is a radio station broadcasting an Urban Adult Contemporary format. Licensed to Statenville, Georgia, United States, the station serves the Valdosta area. The station is currently owned by La Taurus Productions Inc. and features programming from ABC Radio.

References

External links
 FOXY 97 official website

HLJ-FM
Urban adult contemporary radio stations in the United States